Berwick station may refer to:

 Berwick railway station (disambiguation)
 Berwick power station (disambiguation)

See also
 North Berwick Lifeboat Station, North Berwick, East Lothian, Scotland, UK
 Station (disambiguation)
 Berwick (disambiguation)